The 1897–98 Northern Rugby Football Union season was the third season of rugby league football.

Summary

The leading try scorer this season was Hoskins of Salford, who crossed the line 30 times. The leading goal scorer was Albert Goldthorpe of Hunslet who was successful 66 times. The leading points scorer was also Goldthorpe who scored 135 points in the season.

Oldham won the Lancashire Senior Competition and Hunslet won in Yorkshire, but only after winning a play-off with Bradford.

Rule changes
 The line-out was abolished and replaced with the punt-out.
 The value of all goals was reduced to two points.

Lancashire Senior Competition
Oldham won the Lancashire competition outright. Although participating in the Lancashire Senior Competition, Runcorn and Stockport were from Cheshire. Warrington, and Widnes were in Lancashire until the 1974 boundary changes and now lie within the northern boundary of Cheshire.

Source: R.L.Yearbook 1995-96 cited in "The Vault".

League points: for win = 2; for draw = 1; for loss = 0.
Pld = Games played; W = Wins; D = Draws; L = Losses; PF = Match points scored; PA = Match points conceded; PD = Points difference; Pts = League points.
Notes

Yorkshire Senior Competition
Hunslet and Bradford ended the league season with 48 points. In a championship play-off Hunslet beat Bradford 5–2.

Source: R.L.Yearbook 1995-96 cited in "The Vault".

League points: for win = 2; for draw = 1; for loss = 0.
Pld = Games played; W = Wins; D = Draws; L = Losses; PF = Match points scored; PA = Match points conceded; PD = Points difference; Pts = League points.

References

Sources
 

1897 in English rugby league
1898 in English rugby league
Northern Rugby Football Union seasons